A Whole New Thing is the twelfth studio album by Billy Preston, released in 1977. It was Preston's final album with A&M Records.

Wide Stride was released as a single in 1977 and peaked at number 33 on the US R&B chart.

Track listing

Side One
 "Whole New Thing" (Truman Thomas, Jeffrey Bowen, James Ford)  – 3:35
 "Disco Dancin'" (Billy Preston)  – 3:30
 "Complicated Sayings" (Preston, Robert "Inky" Incorvaia)  – 2:54
 "Attitudes" instrumental (Preston)  – 2:29
 "I'm Really Gonna Miss You" (Preston)  – 3:48

Side Two
 "Wide Stride" instrumental (Preston)  – 3:15
 "You Got Me Buzzin'" (Preston, Incorvaia)  – 2:42
 "Sweet Marie" (Preston, Joe Greene)  – 3:40
 "Happy" instrumental (Preston)  – 2:20
 "Touch Me Love" (Preston, Jack Ackerman)  – 3:22
 "You Don't Have to Go" (Preston, Greene)  – 3:00

Personnel 

Billy Preston - keyboards, guitars, bass, percussion, vocals
Eugene Henderson - guitar
Tony Maiden - guitar
Michael McGloiry - guitar
Welton Gite - bass
Keni Burke - bass
Kenneth Moore - keyboards
Truman Thomas - keyboards
Manuel Kellough - drums
Ollie E. Brown - drums
Alvin Taylor - drums
Bobbye Hall - percussion
Angelo Richards - trumpet
Wynell Montgomery - saxophone
Charles Garnett - trumpet
Gloria Jones - backing vocals
Andre Crough - backing vocals
Frankie Spring - backing vocals
Clydie King - backing vocals
Joe Greene - backing vocals

References

Whole New Thing, A
Whole New Thing, A
Albums produced by Billy Preston
A&M Records albums